The Grammy Award for Best Pop Instrumental Performance by an Arranger, Composer, Orchestra and/or Choral Leader was awarded at the 15th Annual Grammy Awards for music released in the previous year. 1973 was the only year in which the Grammy Award for Best Pop Instrumental Performance was split into Best Pop Instrumental Performance by an Arranger, Composer, Orchestra and/or Choral Leader and Best Pop Instrumental Performance - Instrumental Performer.

Recipients

See also
List of Grammy Award categories
Grammy Award for Best Pop Instrumental Performance

References

Pop Instrumental Performance with Vocal Coloring